Ngozi is a town located in northern Burundi. It is the largest urban center in the Ngozi Province and the location of the provincial headquarters.

Location
The town of Ngozi is located in Ngozi Commune, in Ngozi Province, in central northern Burundi.

The geographical coordinates of Ngozi Town are: 02°54'30.0"S, 29°49'37.0"E (Latitude: -2.908333; Longitude:29.826944).

Population
The national population census of 16 August 1990 enumerated the population at 14,511. On 16 August 2008, the national census that year put the population of Ngozi, Burundi at 39,774 people.

Economy
The residents in the town and surrounding communities are primarily subsistence agriculturalists who also keep domesticated animals, primarily cattle. Crops raised include maize, sweet potatoes, coffee, bananas, cassava, beans and tea. Light industrial activities include the processing of tea and mining of tin ore.

Education
The location of the campus of the University of Ngozi, a private university, that was established in 1999.

Banking
Econank Burundi, a commercial bank, maintains a branch in Ngozi, Burundi.

Electricity
The Kigoma–Butare–Ngozi–Gitega High Voltage Power Line, which connects the electricity grids of Rwanda and Burundi passes through the town of Ngozi, Burundi.

See also
 Commune of Ngozi

References

External links 
 Satellite Map of Ngozi Town, Burundi

Populated places in Burundi
Ngozi Province
Ngozi, Burundi